The Discipline of Steel is the first demo by the Finnish Heavy Metal band Kiuas self-released in 2002. The demo's theme concentrates around the importance of steel and features an album cover edited by computer graphics of a working blacksmith.

Track listing 
 "Until We Reach the Shore" − 5:57
 "Behind the Glass" − 6:49
 "The Wisdom of Steel" − 1:28
 "The Discipline of Steel" − 11:51

Credits 
 All music by Salovaara except "The Discipline of Steel" by Salovaara and Tuominen.
 Engineered and mixed by Yki
 Cover art by ToxicAngel

Kiuas albums
2002 EPs